The 2018 Qamishli clashes were a skirmish that erupted between the Syrian Arab Army and the Asayish forces in the city of Qamishli, Syria on September 8, 2018.

Background 
Qamishli is partially controlled between the Syrian Government and the Democratic Federation of Northern Syria.
This situation has created tensions between the two sides, like the Battle of Qamishli (2016).

The clashes 
The clashes erupted on 8 September 2018. According to Kurdish sources, the fighting took place after a Syrian government patrol consisting of three vehicles entered areas controlled by the Asayish, arrested civilians, and targeted their forces with light and medium weapons. They then responded to the attack. The Syrian government claims that the soldiers were on their way to the Qamishli Airport, which is under its control, when they were attacked. According to a source within the Syrian military, the soldiers that the Asayish targeted had previously prevented United States troops from entering Qamishli. The attack was believed to have taken place in retaliation for this confrontation with American troops. The clashes left 11 government soldiers killed and 2 wounded and 7 Asayish members killed and one wounded.

See also 
 Battle of Qamishli (2016)
 Rojava–Syria relations

References 

Conflicts in 2018
Military operations of the Syrian civil war in 2018
September 2018 events in Syria
Military operations of the Syrian civil war involving the Syrian government
Military operations of the Syrian civil war involving the Syrian Democratic Forces
Al-Hasakah Governorate in the Syrian civil war
Battles of the Syrian civil war